Nagayevo (Nuğay) is a rural locality (a selo) in Ufa, Bashkortostan, Russia. The population was 1,479 as of 2010. There are 166 streets.

Geography 
Nagayevo is located 18 km southeast of Ufa. Zinino is the nearest rural locality.

References 

Rural localities in Ufa urban okrug